The Down Grade is a 1927 American silent action film directed by Charles Hutchison and starring William Fairbanks, Alice Calhoun and Charles K. French.

Cast
 William Fairbanks as Ted Lanning 
 Alice Calhoun as Molly Crane 
 Charles K. French as Mr. Lanning 
 Guinn 'Big Boy' Williams as Ed Holden 
 Jimmy Aubrey as The Runt

References

Bibliography
 Munden, Kenneth White. The American Film Institute Catalog of Motion Pictures Produced in the United States, Part 1. University of California Press, 1997.

External links
 

1927 films
1920s action films
American silent feature films
American action films
Films directed by Charles Hutchison
American black-and-white films
Rail transport films
Gotham Pictures films
1920s English-language films
1920s American films